Umatu festival is one of the six major festivities held in Onitsha Ado N'Idu every year. The others are Ajachi, Owuwaji, Ofala, Osisi- Ite and Ife-Jioku. The Umatu is celebrated when the first maize has been cultivated. The people meet with the King (Obi) and his red hat leaders (Ndiche) to celebrate the prosperity of the maize crop.

History 
The Umatu Festival is inspired by Exodus 23:16: “Celebrate the Harvest Festival when you begin to harvest your crops. Celebrate the Festival of Shelter in the autumn, when you gather the fruit from your vineyard and orchard’’. This dance is usually hierarchical, from the bottom to the top. Onowu Iyasele (Traditional Prime Minister) is the highest ranking chief who dances himself before the Obi of Onitsha.

Festivity 

Goats and fowls are also slain in order to make either  or  soup (draw soup). The people and the community in the entire area then pray for good health and prosperity.

The Umatu is of great significance to the farming community of Onicha at that time, as reflected in an old saying, meaning the farmland which you could pick okro, signifies that yam harvests are approaching (New yam festival).

The Umatu festival lasts 16 days, starting with the Obi of Onitsha private celebration. Then, for four days Eze-Idi, Ikpala Isi, Umueze Chima and Ikpoko Akwukwo Ogili joined the festivities on the following order; the last day was marked by a clearance of vegetable containers and packages.

The Umatu festival in Onitsha in 2020 was organized in conformity with the Covid-19 safety requirements and protocols.

References 

Festivals in Nigeria